One to One is the 12th album by American singer-songwriter Carole King, released in 1982. It is also the name of the accompanying concert video, currently available only on VHS and Laser Disc.

'One to One' the video contains on-camera comments by Carole King as well as live performances from 'One to One' the studio album, and some of her best-known songs from previous LP's.

Track listing
All songs by Carole King unless otherwise noted.
"One to One" (King, Cynthia Weil) – 3:16
"It's a War" – 3:08
"Lookin' Out for Number One" – 3:15
"Life Without Love" (Gerry Goffin, Louise Goffin, Warren Pash) – 3:48
"Golden Man" – 5:24
"Read Between the Lines" – 2:54
"(Love Is Like A) Boomerang" – 2:35
"Goat Annie" – 4:01
"Someone You Never Met Before" (Goffin, King) – 3:16
"Little Prince" – 2:06

Personnel
 Carole King – lead vocals, backing vocals (1, 2, 4), acoustic piano (1, 2, 4-7, 9, 10), Wurlitzer electronic piano (2), Fender Rhodes electric piano (10)
 Reese Wynans – acoustic piano (1, 3, 8), Fender Rhodes electric piano (1, 4-7), Hammond organ (2, 9), synthesizer (4)
 Robert McEntee – acoustic guitar (1, 5), electric guitar (2-5, 7, 8), backing vocals (2, 3, 5), slide guitar (8)
 Eric Johnson – electric guitar (1, 3, 4, 5, 7), Fender Rhodes electric piano (7)
 Danny Kortchmar – electric guitar solo (2), electric guitar (9)
 Charles Larkey – bass guitar (1-9)
 Steve Meador – drums (1-9)
 Christopher Dennis – percussion (1-5, 7), tambourine (6), goat bell (8)
 George Bohanon – horn arrangements (2, 3)
 John Mills – baritone saxophone (2, 3)
 Richard Hardy – tenor saxophone (2, 3), flute (5), alto saxophone (7)
 Donald Knaub – bass trombone (2, 3)
 Michael Mordecai – trombone (2, 3)
 Raymond Crisara – trumpet (2, 3)
 Scott McIntosh – trumpet (2, 3)
 Bill Ginn – string arrangements (10)
 Leonard Posner – concertmaster (10)
 Ted Herring – cello (10)
 Delta Holl – cello (10)
 Sallie Banks – viola (10)
 Shirley Blair – viola (10)
 Stepen Edwards – viola (10)
 Lucia Woodroff – viola (10)
 Michael Fizzell – violin (10)
 Marylynn Fletcher – violin (10)
 Dorothy Goodenough – violin (10)
 Georgeann Nero – violin (10)
 Nancy Nicoles – violin (10)
 Douglas Tabony – violin (10)
 Betty Whitlock – violin (10)
 Mark Hallman – backing vocals (1-6), acoustic guitar (8), string arrangements (10)
 Debbie James – backing vocals (5)
 Louise Goffin – backing vocals (6, 9)
 Sherry Goffin – backing vocals (6)

Production
 Producers – Carole King and Mark Hallman
 Production Coordination – Gayle Goff
 Engineer – Chet Himes 
 Additional and Assistant Engineer – James Tuttle
 Assistant Engineer on Tracks 4 & 10 – Tom Cummings
 Tracks 1-9 recorded at Studio South (Austin, TX).
 Track 10 recorded at Kendun Recorders (Burbank, CA).
 Tracks 1, 2, 3 & 5-10 mixed at Studio South.
 Track 4 remixed at Kendun Recorders.
 Mastered by Bobby Hata at Amigo Studios (Burbank, CA).
 Direction – Michael Brovsky and Witt Stewart
 Art Direction and Design – Dick Reeves and John Wilson, assisted by Bill Maye.
 Photography – Jim McGuire

LP Chart position

The album's lead single "One to One" peaked at #45 on Billboard's Hot 100 in 1982.

References

External links
Carole King discography.

1982 albums
Carole King albums
Atlantic Records albums